The Long Ride is an album by the American folk musician Ramblin' Jack Elliott, released in 1999. It was nominated for a Grammy Award, in the "Best Traditional Folk Album" category.

Guests include Dave Van Ronk, Tom Russell, and Maria Muldaur.

Reception

Bobby Reed of No Depression wrote that the "duet renditions of old folk tunes are the real meat of this Americana meal ... Elliott’s limited vocal range and spare guitar playing, along with the song’s running time of 7-and-a-half minutes, make for a long, rocky close to this uneven album."

Track listing 
"Connection" (Mick Jagger, Keith Richards) – 3:09
"Cup of Coffee" (Ramblin' Jack Elliott) – 6:16
"Ranger's Command" (Woody Guthrie) – 3:30
"Pony" (Tom Waits) – 3:23
"St. James Infirmary" (Joe Primrose, Traditional) – 3:20
"Picture from Life's Other Side" (Traditional) – 5:03
"East Virginia Blues" (Carter, Traditional) – 3:59
"The Sky Above and the Mud Below" (Tom Russell) – 6:15
"Take Me Back and Try Me One More Time" (Ernest Tubb) – 3:27
"Now He's Just Dust in the Wind" (Elliott, Roy Rogers) – 4:33
"True Blue Jeans" (Elliott, Rogers) – 2:31
"Diamond Joe" (Traditional) – 3:17
"With God on Our Side" (Bob Dylan) – 7:30

Personnel
Ramblin' Jack Elliott – vocals, guitar
Roy Rogers – guitar, slide guitar, pedal steel guitar
Dave Van Ronk – vocals, guitar (on "St. James Infirmary")
Tom Russell – vocals (on "Cup of Coffee", "Take Me Back and Try Me One More Time" and "The Sky Above and the Mud Below")
Maria Muldaur – vocals (on "Picture from Life's Other Side")
Dave Alvin – guitar, vocals (on "East Virginia Blues")
Norton Buffalo – harmonica
Jimmy Sanchez – drums
Joe Craven – banjo, fiddle, mandolin
Bruce Gordon – accordion
Andrew Hardin – guitar
Derek Jones – bass
Production notes:
Roy Rogers – producer
Allen Sudduth – engineer, mixing
Gene Cornelius – assistant engineer
Cindy Pascarello – design
Curtis Martin – artwork, photography, cover photo
Jan Currie – photography, cover photo

References

1999 albums
Ramblin' Jack Elliott albums
HighTone Records albums